Ilija Birčanin (12 August 1764 – 4 January 1804) was a Serbian knez (Prince) who was killed during the Slaughter of the Dukes, the incident that sparked the First Serbian Uprising of the Serbian Revolution, ultimately leading to Serbia's liberation from the Ottoman Empire.

Life
As was the case with most of the prominent 19th-century Serbian families who migrated from other Serbian lands to Serbia, the Birčanin family came from the Banjani Serbian tribe from Herzegovinian Birč near Nikšić (Old Herzegovina).

At the end of November 1797 Ilija Birčanin together with two other ober knezes from Valjevo (Aleksa Nenadović and Nikola Grbović) brought Serb forces to Belgrade to support Hadži Mustafa Pasha to fight Janissary forces and forced them to retreat. In January 1798 Mustafa Pasha sent forces under command of Ilija Birčanin to attack Janissary forces in Smederevo.

Ilija Birčanin is also famous in Serbia because of his appearance in the epic poem "Почетак буне против дахија" ("Onset of the uprising against the dahije"). In this poem, while the Turkish governors (or dahije) are organising the Slaughter of the Dukes, they say how particularly glad they will be to kill Ilija Birčanin because of his cynical behavior. Although he was subject to the Turks and had to collect taxes for them, Birčanin used to act as if he were the chief and the Turks were his servants. Ilija Birčanin is described in the poem as "wearing his moustache under his hat".

Birčanin and the Serb chieftain Aleksa Nenadović were brought before a large crowd of Christian and Muslim onlookers in Valjevo, where Nenadovic was publicly accused of conspiring with Austrians against the sultan. The two were then publicly decapitated and their bodies were dumped in an open meadow by the Kolubara River, causing the residents to panic and flee.

References

Sources
 

1764 births
1804 deaths
Military personnel from Valjevo
People of the First Serbian Uprising
Serbian soldiers
Serbs from the Ottoman Empire
18th-century Serbian people
19th-century Serbian people
People murdered in Serbia
Executed Serbian people
People executed by the Ottoman Empire by decapitation
Trophy heads
Burials at Serbian Orthodox monasteries and churches